Dakshin Bihar Gramin Bank is an Indian regional rural bank (RRB) in the state of Bihar, India. The bank was incorporated on 1 January 2019 by amalgamating 2 RRBs namely Madhya Bihar Gramin Bank and Bihar Gramin Bank. Dakshin Bihar Gramin Bank is sponsored by Punjab National Bank. The Bank operates in 20 districts of Bihar viz. Banka, Begusarai, Bhagalpur, Jamui, Khagaria, Lakhisarai, Buxar 
Rohtas Munger, Sheikhpura and Samastipur, jahanabad, arwal. The Bank has 1078 branches as on 1 January 2019. It is under the ownership of Ministry of Finance , Government of India.

Dr. Ashutosh Kumar Jha is the current chairman of Dakshin Bihar Gramin Bank.

References

External links
 Old Website
 

Regional rural banks of India
Banks established in 2019
Economy of Bihar
2019 establishments in Bihar
Indian companies established in 2019